Tadhg mac Dáire Mac Bruaideadha) (1570–1652) was an Irish Gaelic poet and historian.

Biography
Born in County Clare to a family of chroniclers for the Earl of Thomond, Tadhg mac Dáire Mac Bruaideadha was most recognised for beginning the Contention of the bards. He attacked the bard Torna Eigeas by composing a poem that claimed superiority of the O'Briens over the O'Neills, or the southern septs of Ireland over the north.  He was ollamh to Donnchadh Ó Briain. In 1652 he was assassinated by marauding soldiers of Oliver Cromwell’s army.

Among his family was a brother, Domhnall mac Dáire Mac Bruaideadha.

See also
 Seán Buí Mac Bruideadha, fl. 1300s.
 Diarmuid Mac Bruideadha, d. 1563.

References

MacBrody family
1570 births
1652 deaths
Irish-language poets
People from County Clare
17th-century Irish historians
People of Elizabethan Ireland